Mohammadabad-e Afshar (also Romanized as Moḩammadābād-e Afshār) is a village in Ramjin Rural District, Chaharbagh District, Savojbolagh County, Alborz Province, Iran. At the 2006 census, its population was 466, in 109 families.

References 

Populated places in Savojbolagh County